Eros|Anteros is the second studio album by Belgian band Oathbreaker. It was released on 16 July 2013 by Deathwish Inc. The album has been praised for successfully mixing diverse genres including black metal, hardcore punk and shoegazing. The title references Eros and Anteros, gods of love in Greek mythology.

Track listing

Personnel

Oathbreaker 
 Caro Tanghe
 Lennart Bossu
 Gilles Demolder
 Ivo Debrabandere

Other 
 Maurice Maeterlinck – poem on (Beeltenis) and Clair Obscur
 Kurt Ballou – additional guitars on (Beeltenis) and Clair Obscur

Production 
 Kurt Ballou – engineering and production
 Brad Boatright – mastering
 Jeroen Mylle – photography
 Valentijn Goethals & Tomas Lootens – art direction and design

References

2013 albums
Oathbreaker (band) albums
Albums produced by Kurt Ballou
Deathwish Inc. albums